Peter Gregg (born March 6, 1951, Kent, Ohio) is a producer and musician.  Gregg played lead guitar on the earliest recordings of the prototype predecessor to the musical group Devo, under his stage name Coupe de Ville.

Gregg later worked as an engineer at the Record Plant Studios in Los Angeles, as a cameraman for Merv Griffin Productions at Caesars Palace on the Las Vegas Strip, at MTV in New York City, and as a technical director for WWE.

He produced "CARACOL: The Last Maya City" for PBS.

References

People from Kent, Ohio
1951 births
Living people
20th-century American guitarists
Guitarists from Ohio